The Nine Chapter Law is the most important law in the Han Dynasty and had great influence on the laws in the Chinese history.

The authorship of the law is most commonly attributed to Xiao He. The Book of Han noted that after the Han Dynasty was established at 206 BC, emperor Liu Bang thought the wartime three treaty laws are inadequate for the crimes, and the Book of Jin recorded that Chancellor Xiao He adapted law code from the Qin Dynasty code and added 3 more chapters. The law got its name from the 6 chapters adopted from the Canon of Laws and 3 new chapters covering family register, conscription and livestock.

In the second year of Empress Lü Zhi's reign, the Second‐Year Law was published, and the Nine Chapter Law can no longer be used to reference the entirety of the Han Dynasty legislation. The Jin Dynasty (266–420) adopted the nine chapter law and added 11 more chapters, and formed its own 20 chapter legal code. In the dynasties that followed supplement laws had been announced and obsolete code removed. The nine chapter law's longevity was shown in its presence in the legal system of the Sui Dynasty (589–618 CE).

References

Legal history of China
Han dynasty
2nd century BC in law